Carex exsiccata, the western inflated sedge or beaked sedge (a name it shares with other members of its genus), is a species of flowering plant in the family Cyperaceae, native to British Columbia, Washington state, Oregon, Idaho, Montana, Colorado, and California. Native peoples used its roots to make a black dye.

References

exsiccata
Flora of British Columbia
Flora of the Northwestern United States
Flora of California
Plants described in 1889